For the swimming competitions at the 2016 Summer Olympics, the following qualification systems were in place. Qualification ended on 3 July 2016.

Qualifying standards 
A National Olympic Committee (NOC) may enter a maximum of 2 qualified athletes in each individual event, only if both athletes have attained the Olympic Qualifying Time (OQT). One athlete per event can potentially enter if they meet the Olympic Selection Time (OST) or if the quota of 900 athletes has not been targeted. NOCs may also permit swimmers regardless of time (1 per gender) under a Universality place, as long as they have no swimmers reaching either the standard entry time.

In the relay events, a maximum of 16 qualifying teams in each relay event must be permitted to accumulate a total of 96 relay teams; each NOC may enter only one team. The first twelve teams in each relay event at the 2015 World Championships will automatically compete for the relay events at the Olympics; while the remaining four per relay event must obtain their fastest entry times based on the FINA World Rankings of 31 May 2016 during the process.

Following the end of the qualification period, FINA will assess the number of athletes having achieved the OQT, the number of relay-only swimmers, and the number of Universality places, before inviting athletes with OST to fulfill the total quota of 900. Additionally, OST places will be distributed by event according to the position of the FINA World Rankings during the qualifying deadline (3 July 2016).

The qualifying time standards must be obtained in World Championships, Continental Championships, Continental Qualification Events, National Championships and Trials, or International Competitions approved by FINA in the period between 1 March 2015 to 3 July 2016.

FINA qualifying standards are as follows:

Individual events 
Those who have achieved the Olympic Qualifying Time (OQT) or the Olympic Selection Time (OST), or have been guaranteed a Universality place are listed below for each of the following individual events:

Men's individual events

Men's 50 m freestyle

Men's 100 m freestyle

Men's 200 m freestyle

Men's 400 m freestyle

Men's 1500 m freestyle

Men's 100 m backstroke

Men's 200 m backstroke

Men's 100 m breaststroke

Men's 200 m breaststroke

Men's 100 m butterfly

Men's 200 m butterfly

Men's 200 m individual medley

Men's 400 m individual medley

Women's individual events

Women's 50 m freestyle

Women's 100 m freestyle

Women's 200 m freestyle

Women's 400 m freestyle

Women's 800 m freestyle

Women's 100 m backstroke

Women's 200 m backstroke

Women's 100 m breaststroke

Women's 200 m breaststroke

Women's 100 m butterfly

Women's 200 m butterfly

Women's 200 m individual medley

Women's 400 m individual medley

Relay events

Men's 4×100 m freestyle relay

Men's 4×200 m freestyle relay

Men's 4×100 m medley relay

Women's 4×100 m freestyle relay

Women's 4×200 m freestyle relay

Women's 4×100 m medley relay

Open water events

Timeline

Men's 10 km marathon 

° Unused host quota place
^ Unused continental quota place

Women's 10 km marathon 

° Unused host quota place
^ Unused continental quota place

Notes

References

External links
 FINA – Rio 2016 Olympic Coverage

 
2012
Qualification for the 2016 Summer Olympics